Cuthbert and the Nightwalkers are a seven piece pop band from Sydney. They have released two albums and were winners of a Triple J Unearthed competition.

Discography
"Love Needs Us" (2007)
"Mr Pickwick's Camera" (2009)

Awards and nominations

J Award
The J Awards are an annual series of Australian music awards that were established by the Australian Broadcasting Corporation's youth-focused radio station Triple J. They commenced in 2005.

|-
| J Awards of 2007
|themselves
| Unearthed Artist of the Year
|

References

External links

New South Wales musical groups